The soft left, also historically known as the Tribunite left and more recently as the open left, is a faction within the British Labour Party. The term "soft left" was coined to distinguish the mainstream left of Michael Foot from the hard left of Tony Benn. People belonging to the soft left may be called soft leftists or Tribunites.

History 
The distinction between hard and soft left became evident during the leadership of Michael Foot (1980–83), who, along with Tony Benn, was one of the two figureheads of the party left. Supporters of Foot (an anti-communist whose background was in the Tribune group) and Benn (originally on the party's right but by the end of the 1970s to Foot's left and a more uncompromising supporter of unilateral nuclear disarmament) became increasingly polarised.

In the election for the deputy leadership of the Labour Party in 1981, left-wingers such as Neil Kinnock abstained from voting for Tony Benn, signaling the emergence of an independent soft left grouping in the party. The term came to be used in contrast to hard left, who were more explicitly socialist in rhetoric, remaining associated with Benn. In common with the party right, the soft left was suspicious of the hard left's alliance with Trotskyism (particularly its links with Militant), supported a parliamentary rather than extra-parliamentary road to socialism, retreated from a commitment to widening public ownership of the economy, and tended towards Atlanticist or Europeanist rather than anti-imperialist foreign policy.

The parliamentary group which came to be associated with the soft left was the Tribune group. The Tribune group was formed around the newspaper of the same name and had represented the party left as a whole until Benn's allies formed the Socialist Campaign Group. The Labour Co-ordinating Committee grew to become the soft left's main factional organisation in the 1980s, despite having begun its life as a Bennite or "hard left" body. The soft left, influenced by the intellectual interventions of Mike Rustin, Geoff Hodgson and Peter Hain, increasingly rejected the socialism from above of Stalinism and social democracy and instead stressed pluralism, including a variety of forms of social ownership and widening Labour's electoral coalition. Figures identified with the soft left in the 1980s included David Blunkett, Robin Cook, Bryan Gould and Clare Short. 

While Kinnock initially emerged from the soft left, portraying himself as a "media friendly Michael Foot", he tacked to the right of the Tribune group, although they continued to vote with him in the National Executive Committee. Soft left candidates increasingly gained positions in the party leadership after 1983, but Kinnock and deputy leader Roy Hattersley kept the party to their right. Kinnock's defeat in the 1992 general election signalled an end to the soft left's rise, as they were increasingly marginalised by the modernisation project associated with Tony Blair. The 1980s soft left began to diverge over time; for example, some figures (such as Blunkett) became loyalists to Blair by the end of the 1990s. However, activist figures such as the National Executive Committee member Ann Black and a range of MPs continued to work as part of the 'broad left'.

Contemporary soft left 
The term was occasionally used during Labour's period in government from 1997 to 2010 to describe Labour politicians who were positioned to the left of New Labour, but to the right of the Socialist Campaign Group.

In the 2010s, the term soft left has been used to describe politicians such as Ed Miliband or Lisa Nandy, who were seen as ideologically on the left wing of the Labour Party, but perceived to be more willing to make a political compromise rather than their hard left counterparts in Labour. The phrase has been used to describe political figures such as Sadiq Khan. 

In 2015, Neal Lawson, the chair of the think tank Compass, identified the organisation as a successor to the soft left. Compass disaffiliated from Labour in 2011 in order to open up their membership to people belonging to other political parties. The activist group Open Labour was launched in 2015 with the aim of developing a new forum for the soft left political tradition within the party, which it hopes to recast as the "Open Left". In the 2017 general election, several Open Labour activists were elected to Parliament including Open Labour Treasurer Alex Sobel, Emma Hardy and Rosie Duffield. 

In the aftermath of Jeremy Corbyn's party leadership (2015–19), the term was generally used to mean "the space between Corbynite remnants on the left, and Progress and Labour First on the right". Keir Starmer, the current leader of the Labour Party, and Angela Rayner, the current deputy leader, have both been described as soft left.

Labour politicians on the soft left 
People belonging to the soft left may be called soft leftists or Tribunites. The following Labour politicians are often considered on the soft left of the party, but may not identify themselves as such:

Andy Burnham
Anneliese Dodds
Angela Eagle
Barry Gardiner
Kate Green
Nia Griffith
Louise Haigh
Emma Hardy
John Healey
Sadiq Khan
Anna McMorrin
Ed Miliband
Lisa Nandy
Angela Rayner
Alex Sobel
Keir Starmer
Paul Sweeney
Emily Thornberry
John Denham

See also 

 Anti-Stalinist left
 Centrism
 Left-wing politics
 Bevanism
 Blairism
 Brownism
 Democratic socialism
 Militant tendency
 Momentum (organisation)
 Social democracy
 Social Democratic Party (UK)
 Third Way
 Tribune (magazine)

References

Further reading 
 What is the Democratic Left?.
 John Carvel and Patrick Wintour. Kinnock wins accord on defence switch Guardian. 10 May 1989.
 Field Guide to the American Left.
 Labour activists launch new group on party's left.

Labour Party (UK) factions